John McEnroe was the defending champion but lost in the semifinals to Stefan Edberg.

Edberg won in the final 6–3, 2–6, 6–4 against Ivan Lendl.

Seeds
The top eight seeds received a bye to the second round.

Draw

Finals

Top half

Section 1

Section 2

Bottom half

Section 3

Section 4

External links
 1989 Suntory Japan Open Tennis Championships draw

Singles